The Monti Trebulani or Colli Caprensi is a mountain range  in the province of Caserta, Campania, southern Italy.

They take their name from the ancient city of Trebula Balliensis, a Roman colony founded in the 3rd-2nd century BC, whose remains are in the frazione Treglia of the comune of Pontelatone.

The range has a length of some 20 km, from north to south, starting from the territory of Pietravairano to Bellona.

Sights include the grotto of San Michele, in the comune of Liberi.

See also
Geography of Italy

Mountain ranges of the Apennines
Mountain ranges of Italy
Mountains of Campania